Wierzbno  is a settlement, part of the village of Boguchwałów, in the administrative district of Gmina Baborów, within Głubczyce County, Opole Voivodeship, in southern Poland.

The name of the village is of Polish origin and comes from the word wierzba, which means "willow".

References

Villages in Głubczyce County